Joseph D. Grant County Park is the largest county park in Santa Clara County, California. Also known as Grant Ranch Park, this site is situated in the Diablo Range foothills of the eastern Santa Clara Valley.  The park is one of 28 owned by Santa Clara County and managed by the Santa Clara County Parks and Recreation Department.

Joseph D. Grant, son of a wealthy San Francisco merchant, began buying what had been the Rancho Cañada de Pala Mexican land grant. Grant used the property for grazing cattle, recreating, and hunting game. Joseph D. Grant died in 1942.

Joseph D. Grant County Park is situated in the Diablo Range, near Mount Hamilton.  Elevations range from about 1,400 feet (427 m) in Halls Valley to peaks over 2,985 feet (910 m) on the Park's eastern edge.  This upward gradient leads to even higher peaks in the crest of the range and to Mount Hamilton itself at 4,209 feet (1,283 m).  The western slopes of Mount Hamilton drop into Smith Creek which forms the eastern boundary of the Park.

The park is known for mountain biking, birdwatching and hiking.  Some of the special status biota within Joseph D. Grant County Park are the burrowing owl and the Western pond turtle. The park also offers camp sites.

Gallery

See also
Blue Oak Ranch Reserve
Mount Hamilton

References

External links
 Santa Clara County government page about Joseph D Grant County Park

County Parks in Santa Clara County, California
Diablo Range
Bay Area Ridge Trail